The Grand Canyon Unified School District #4 is a school district located in Grand Canyon Village in unincorporated Coconino County, Arizona, United States.

Overview
The district operates under the leadership of superintendent, Matthew Yost and interim principal, Lori Rommel and five school board members.

Students in grades K-12 attend school on a campus with six buildings. The school has a four-day week; elementary students K-5 attend from 7:50 to 3:50 while grades 6-12 attend from 7:50-4:02.

Schools
Grand Canyon Elementary School (grades K-8; 223 students)
Grand Canyon High School (grades 9–12; 80 students)

History
On July 10, 1911, the first school in the Grand Canyon opened.  In 1916, the first county-funded schoolhouse was built, which still exists.  Four years later, a parent-teacher association was formed.

References

External links

International Baccalaureate schools in Arizona
School districts in Coconino County, Arizona
School districts established in 1911
1911 establishments in Arizona Territory